Sir Henry de Bohun (died 23 June 1314) was an English knight, the grandson of Humphrey de Bohun, 2nd Earl of Hereford. He was killed on the first day of the Battle of Bannockburn by Robert the Bruce.

Riding in the vanguard of heavy cavalry, de Bohun caught sight of the Scottish king who was mounted on a small palfrey (ane gay palfray Li till and joly) armed only with a battle-axe. 

De Bohun lowered his lance and charged, but Bruce stood his ground, riding on towards the English knight. The two men sped towards each other (Sprent thai samyn intill a ling). At the last moment Bruce manoeuvred his mount nimbly to one side, stood up in his stirrups and hit de Bohun so hard with his axe that it cut through both Sir Henry's helmet and skull and into his brain (That ner the heid till the harnys clave). Despite the great risk the King had taken, he merely expressed regret that he had broken the shaft of his favourite axe.

An iconic description and picture of the death of Henry de Bohun is contained in Scotland's Story by H. E. Marshall.

References

English people of the Wars of Scottish Independence
English military personnel killed in action
14th-century English people
1314 deaths
Year of birth unknown
Henry
English deaths at the Battle of Bannockburn
English duellists